Jesse Jarue Mark (1906-1971) was one of the first African-Americans to gain a PhD in botany, and likely to be the first at Iowa State University, where he joined the faculty. He was also a Rockefeller Agriculture Fellow.

Early life

Jesse Jarue Mark was born in 1906 in Apple Springs, Texas, a town that had a school with 28 children in 1896 and a total population of 75 by World War I. A mis-spelling of his name as Jessie in the historical record appears to have led to the assumption that he was a woman.

Education and career

Mark attended the historically Black college, Prairie View State College (now Prairie View A&M University). He was awarded a baccalaureate degree in 1929. Mark earned his master's degree at Iowa State University (ISU) in 1931, gained a position as professor at Kentucky State Industrial College (now Kentucky State University), and continued research associated with the Iowa Agricultural Experiment Station at ISU, a research program that was founded in 1888.

Mark was awarded his PhD by ISU in 1935. His doctoral work, "The relation of reserves to cold resistance in alfalfa", was published in 1936 and is in university version and journal version online. Mark studied cold resistance by growing six varieties of Grimm alfalfa known to have different levels of hardiness to cold. He analyzed samples from 50 representative plants of each variety.

Mark was a Rockefeller Agriculture Fellow in 1935-1936. Mark died on February 20, 1971, aged sixty-five. He is buried in the Nigton Memorial Park Cemetery in Texas.

References

1906 births
20th-century American botanists
Iowa State University alumni
Year of death missing
Iowa State University faculty
20th-century African-American scientists